Tawas MRT station is a future elevated Mass Rapid Transit (MRT) station on the Jurong Region Line in Western Water Catchment, Singapore.

Derived from the namesake road nearby, Lorong Tawas, it will be the northern terminus of the West Branch of the Jurong Region Line from 2027 to 2029 before Peng Kang Hill MRT station opens. There will be two station names in the naming exercise - Tawas and Cleantech. Trains entering service at this station will terminate at Choa Chu Kang via Bahar Junction.

History
On 9 May 2018, the Land Transport Authority (LTA) announced that Tawas station would be part of the proposed Jurong Region line (JRL). The station will be constructed as part of Phase 1, JRL (West), consisting of 10 stations between Choa Chu Kang, Boon Lay and Tawas, and is expected to be completed in 2027.

Construction will start in 2020, with completion in 2027. Contract J107 also includes the design and construction of Gek Poh, and associated viaducts.

Initially expected to open in 2026, the restrictions on the construction due to the COVID-19 pandemic has led to delays in the JRL line completion, and the date was pushed to 2027.

Location
The station complex will be situated at JTC CleanTech Park. It is located within the Western Water Catchment planning area, to the west of the Jurong Eco-Garden.

Access to the station will be via 4 exits.

References

Mass Rapid Transit (Singapore) stations
Proposed railway stations in Singapore
Railway stations scheduled to open in 2027